Statistics of Swedish football Division 1 in season 1999.

Overview
It was contested by 28 teams, and GIF Sundsvall and BK Häcken won the championship.

League standings

Norra

Södra

Footnotes

References
Sweden – List of final tables (Clas Glenning)

1999
2
Sweden
Sweden